Aleksandra Krunić and Magda Linette defeated Lyudmyla Kichenok and Jeļena Ostapenko by virtue of walkover to win the women's doubles tennis title at the 2022 Eastbourne International, as Ostapenko incurred a right toe injury before the final match. Krunić and Linette claimed the title by winning only two matches, as their opponents in the semifinals also withdrew. It marked Krunić's sixth career WTA Tour doubles title and Linette's second.

Shuko Aoyama and Ena Shibahara were the defending champions, but they returned to defend their title separately. Aoyama partnered with Chan Hao-ching, but lost in the quarterfinals to Ons Jabeur and Serena Williams. Shibahara partnered with Barbora Krejčíková, but lost in the quarterfinals to Xu Yifan and Yang Zhaoxuan.

Seeds

Draw

Draw

References

External links 
Main draw

Eastbourne Internationalandnbsp;- Doubles
2022 Women's Doubles